A Windowfarm is a hydroponic urban gardening system that was originally developed by Britta Riley using open-source designs. A Windowfarm is an indoor garden that allows for year-round growing in almost any window. It lets plants use natural light, the climate control of your living space, and organic “liquid soil.”

About
Windowfarms was a Brooklyn, NY-based social enterprise that helped city-dwellers around the world grow their own fresh food.  Windowfarms made vertical indoor food gardens that optimize the conditions of windows for year-round indoor growing of greens, herbs, and small vegetables.

How it works
In the hydroponic system, nutrient-spiked water is pumped up from a reservoir at the base of the system and trickles down from bottle to bottle, bathing the plants’ roots along the way. Water and nutrients that are not absorbed collect in the reservoir and will be pumped through again at the next interval. Plants grown in soil have roots that extend far and wide, but hydroponically grown plants roots are hairy and dense. Because the roots are so compact, a hydroponic system is a much more efficient use of space.

Partners
 Grateful Greens (Louisville, Kentucky) was founded by a former chef turned farmer to provide fresher, more delicious produce.
 Mid-Hudson Workshop for the Disabled (Poughkeepsie, New York) employs disabled US war veterans and other physically handicapped workers to give them meaningful work and comprehensive health coverage.
 HARBEC, Inc. (Ontario, New York) makes Windowfarms eco-plastic components.

DIY
In 2009, Founder Britta Riley built the first Windowfarm with friends in her 5th floor Brooklyn apartment window. She collaborated to open and crowdsource the development of a home hydroponic food growing system for apartment windows, building a now defunct social media sharing site, around a set of instructions for making the systems out of repurposed water bottles and plumbing supplies. The site now has nearly 40,000 registered users who have built Windowfarms.

Kickstarter Campaign
Through two Kickstarter campaigns, the social startup raised over $285,000 to bootstrap itself into manufacturing designed Windowfarms in the US and with sustainable practices, with an updated focus on the plants the systems grow — all with the goal of reviving agricultural biodiversity in small scale systems.

One year after funding succeeded on their second campaign the WindowFarm team made a final update to the Kickstarter project page, announcing domestic orders fulfilled.

Out Of business
As of December 31, 2016, debtors, investors, and former employees received a notice that "Windowfarms is going out of business and will not be able to make good on its outstanding balance on your invoices. The company will be fully dissolved by the end of the fiscal year 2016 and does not have sufficient assets to offset this and other debts."

Surviving plans
Although a lot of information from both windowfarms.org and their community has been lost, some of it has still survived. An effort is being made to collect this data online.

Controversy and complaints
Britta Riley estimated Windowfarms’ delivery for December 2012. Product and delivery costs for International pledges: from $120 to more than $300 per backer.  As of April 2014, International backers never received their product nor reimbursement and Windowfarms ignores enquiries, phone calls or emails from International backers.  Simultaneously, Britta Riley (Windowfarms) continues promoting and selling her product locally.

Windowfarms’s definition and mission is ambiguous. There was a community where people from everywhere exchange and develop ‘vertical window farms’ and the commercial WindowFarms priced from $199 to $399. One was a social  community and the other was a company for which Britta Riley is co-founder.

The designs are released under a Creative Commons license which, despite being Non-Commercial (as well as Attribution and Share-Alike), didn't prevent Britta Riley's company from selling the kits for profit.

July 2013, CBC News published an article explaining how Canadian and international backers feel ripped-off by Britta Riley, co-founder of the Windowfarms.

A Netherlands-based part of the community wrote an open letter to Riley, asking her to contact them, and Canadian backers set up a website called windowfarmsfraud.com.

Exhibition
Windowfarms was commissioned to build two large arrays of Windowfarms at The American Museum of Natural History in conjunction with the globe-traveling special exhibition on food, “Our Global Kitchen: Food, Culture, Nature“. The LED grow light powered hydroponic research garden was on view for 10 months at the Columbus and 79th street entrance November 2012-August 2013.

Press
Windowfarms have been featured by NPR, The New York Times, Grist, Art in America, Good Morning America, Wired Blog, the Martha Stewart Show, Garden Culture, ReadyMade magazine, prominent food blogs, and documentary films.

References

Other sources

Hydroponics
Urban agriculture